The Battalgazi Bridge, also known as the Euphrates Railway Bridge, is a  long railway bridge spanning the Euphrates river in eastern Turkey, located about  northeast of Malatya.

The structure was built between 1981-86 by the Turkish State Railways, on the Fevzipaşa-Kurtalan railway, as a replacement for an older bridge, opened in 1935, which was flooded with the construction of the Karakaya Dam. The bridge was the longest bridge in Turkey from 1986 to 2007, when it was surpassed by the Bornova Viaduct in Izmir; and the longest railway bridge until 2008, when surpassed by the Sakarya Viaduct. Currently, it is the 7th longest bridge in the country and 2nd longest railway bridge.

References

Bridges completed in 1986
Railway bridges in Turkey
Buildings and structures in Malatya Province
Buildings and structures in Elazığ Province
Crossings of the Euphrates
Transport in Malatya Province
Transport in Elazığ Province
1986 establishments in Turkey
Turkish State Railways
Bridges over the Euphrates River